Paonias is a genus of moths in the family Sphingidae first described by Jacob Hübner in 1819.

Species
Paonias astylus (Drury 1773)
Paonias excaecatus (J. E. Smith 1797)
Paonias macrops Gehlen, 1933
Paonias myops (J. E. Smith 1797)
Paonias wolfei Cadiou & Haxaire 1997

References

 
Smerinthini
Moth genera
Taxa named by Jacob Hübner